Thomas McCall may refer to:

 Thomas McCall (inventor) (1834–1904), Scottish cartwright and bicycle inventor
 Thomas McCall (umpire) (born 1951), New Zealand cricket umpire
 Thomas E. McCall (1916–1965), U.S. Army soldier and  Medal of Honor recipient
 Thomas J. McCall (1935–1981), member of the Pennsylvania House of Representatives
 Tom McCall (1913–1983), American politician and journalist from Oregon
 Tom McCall (Georgia politician), member of the Georgia House of Representatives
 Tommy McCall, Scottish footballer
 Thomas John McCall, the alter ego of the fictional superhero Badrock, who appears in comic books published by Image Comics.